CS, C-S, C.S., Cs, cs, or cs. may refer to:

Job titles
 Chief Secretary (Hong Kong)
 Chief superintendent, a rank in the British and several other police forces
 Company secretary, a senior position in a private sector company or public sector organisation
 Culinary Specialist, a US Navy occupational rating

Language
 Czech language (ISO 639-1 language code)
 Hungarian cs, a digraph in the Hungarian alphabet

Organizations
 Christian Social Party (Austria), a major conservative political party in the Cisleithania, part of Austria-Hungary, and in the First Republic of Austria
 Citizens (Spanish political party), a post-nationalist political party in Spain

 Congregation of the Missionaries of St. Charles, a Catholic religious congregation, also called Scalabrinians
 Confederate States of America, an unrecognized confederation of secessionist North American slave states existing from 1861 to 1865

Companies
 Colorado and Southern Railway, a railroad company in the western United States
 Comlux Aruba NV (IATA airline code: CS)
 Copenhagen Suborbitals, a Danish non-profit rocket group working on the HEAT1X-TYCHO BRAHE rocket
 CouchSurfing, a hospitality service
 Credit Suisse, a Swiss financial services company
 Comp-Sultants, a defunct microcomputer company

Places
 Cannon Street station, London, UK, abbreviated CS in UK railway slang
 Czechoslovakia (former ISO 3166-1 country code)
 Serbia and Montenegro (former ISO 3166-1 country code)

Science and technology

Biology and medicine
 Cardiogenic shock, a medical emergency where heart fails to pump properly to push blood forward.
 Caesarean section, a surgical procedure to deliver one or more babies, or, rarely, to remove a dead fetus
 Cockayne syndrome, a rare autosomal recessive, congenital disorder
 Conditioned stimulus, in the psychological procedure of classical conditioning
 Corticosteroids, a class of hormones produced in vertebrates, and their synthetic analogues
 Cowden syndrome, a rare autosomal dominant inherited disorder
 (-)-camphene synthase, an enzyme
 CS (gene), which encodes the enzyme citrate synthase

Chemistry
 Caesium or Cesium, symbol Cs, a chemical symbol
 Carbon monosulfide, chemical formula CS

Computing
 Computer science, the scientific and practical approach to computation and its applications
 CS register, or code segment register, in X86 computer architecture
 Cable select, an ATA device setting for automatic master/slave configuration
 Checkstyle, a Java static code analysis tool
 Chip select, a control line in digital electronics
 ChanServ, an IRC network service
 Construction Set, a program for creating or editing PC games (i.e. The Elder Scrolls Construction Set)
 Adobe Creative Suite, a design and development software suite by Adobe Systems
C#, a general-purpose, multi-paradigm programming language.

Mathematics
 cs (elliptic function), one of Jacobi's elliptic functions

Other uses in science and technology
 Carbon steel
 Cirrostratus cloud
 Citizen science
 Compressed sensing, a signal processing technique for reconstructing a signal using underdetermined linear systems
 Control segment, part of the structure of the Global Positioning System
 Counter-scanning, a scanning method that allows correcting raster distortions
 cS, another form for cSt, for centistokes, a unit of viscosity
 CS gas, a riot control agent

Other uses
 Communication Skills
 Controlled substance, generally a drug or chemical whose manufacture, possession, or use is regulated by a government 
 Cable Ship, in civilian ship names
 Calgary Stampede, a rodeo
 Caught stealing, a statistic in baseball
 Chhatrapati Shivaji, c. 1627/1630 – 1680), Indian warrior king and member of the Bhonsle Maratha clan
 Christian Science, a religion
 Cities: Skylines, 2015 city-building simulation video game
 Coke Studio (disambiguation), several musical television shows
 Counter-Strike, a series of video game first released as a 1999 modification for Half-Life
 Cum Suis (Latin: "and associates"); see List of Latin phrases
 Customer service, the provision of service to customers before, during and after a purchase and sale
 Bombardier-Airbus C-Series, small jetliner
 Ferrari 360 Challenge Stradale

See also
 C's (disambiguation)